Solid State Interlocking (SSI) is the brand name of the first generation processor-based interlocking developed in the 1980s by British Rail's Research Division, GEC-General Signal and Westinghouse Signals Ltd in the UK.

Interlocking hardware 
SSI utilises a 2-out-of-3 redundancy architecture, whereby all safety-critical functions are performed in three separate processing lanes and the results voted upon. An SSI interlocking cubicle comprises three Interlocking Processors or Multi Processor Modules (MPMs), two Panel Processors and a Diagnostics Processor (DMPM). An SSI system can operate on two MPMs in the event of the failure of one. It does not need the DMPM to function as an interlocking, as this drives the technician's terminal only.

Data 
Geographic interlocking data, relating to the area of railway under control, is installed using EPROMs contained in plug in memory modules. The interlocking program contained in each of the MPMs interprets this data to allow safe passage of trains through its area of control.

External hardware 

Trackside equipment such as signals and points are connected to nearby 'trackside functional modules' (TFMs). Each module has a number of outputs and inputs. Each output drives an individual function, such as a signal lamp or an AWS inductor. Certain outputs are capable of driving a flashing lamp directly. The inputs are used to send information back to the interlocking, such as indications determined by track circuit relays or points detection circuits, for example.

There are two kinds of TFM; the signal module (identified by a red label) and the points module (black label). A maximum of 63 TFMs may be addressed by one SSI interlocking; in practice the number will be limited by timing issues and the need to allow for future expansion.

Data links 

Communication between interlockings and TFMs is by electronic data packages termed 'telegrams'. Telegrams are transmitted via 'data links', comprising twisted pair copper cable. The data links are duplicated for availability.

A 'data link module' (DLM) is the interface between the data link and the TFMs. A DLM has a blue label.

For transmission over longer distances, fibre-optic cable and pulse-code modulation may be used. Another type of module, the 'long distance terminal' (LDT) is available for this purpose. An LDT has a gold coloured label.

Market penetration 
SSI is widely installed within Great Britain, and has some penetration of other Western European markets. It was first used at Dingwall in 1984 in connection with RETB signalling. The first conventional SSI scheme was at Leamington Spa in 1985, while also in 1985 the application design for use on the first phase of the Docklands Light Railway, London, was begun: this combined the SSI with automation of the route setting and the train driving (ATO/ATP). The second and third SSIs were installed at Midway and Lenz stations in South Africa. The second phase of the Docklands Light Railway in 1987, including the extension to Bank, the re-design of the Poplar / Canary Wharf layout and the reduction of the technical headway to under 2 minutes, saw the expansion of the SSI installation. SSI has also been installed in Indonesia, Hong Kong and other countries. Australia is an extensive user of SSI, particularly New South Wales, where it is installed at busy locations such as Hurstville - Oatley, North Sydney, Wyong, Granville, Enfield, Blacktown, Olympic Park and others within the Transport Asset Holding Entity network.

Future 
Due to the success of SSI within the UK market, Alstom and WRSL have released products (Smartlock and Westlock respectively) which copy a number of its features.  In particular, both re-use the SSI data preparation language and trackside equipment.

A big advantage of these later versions of CBI is that the arbitrary limit of 63 TFM is raised so high that a big interlocking can be handled without having to split the logic into small chunks.

References 

 

Interlocking systems
British Rail research and development
General Electric Company
Railway signalling control